Derib (born Claude de Ribaupierre on August 8, 1944, in La Tour-de-Peilz, Switzerland) is a Swiss francophone comics creator. He is most well known for creating the comics Buddy Longway and Yakari.

Awards
 1974: Best Comic at the Prix Saint-Michel, Belgium
 1978: Best Foreign Artist at the Angoulême International Comics Festival, France
 1982: Youth Award (9-12 years) at the Angoulême International Comics Festival
 1994: nominated for Best German-language Comic/Comic-related Publication at the Max & Moritz Prizes, Germany
 2005: nominated for the Best Series Award at the Angoulême International Comics Festival
 2006: Youth Award (7-8 years) at the Angoulême International Comics Festival

Sources

 Derib publications in Spirou, Pilote, Belgian Tintin, French Tintin BDoubliées 
 BDParadisio.com 
 Bedetheque.com

External links

Official website 
 
Derib official website 
Derib biography on Lambiek Comiclopedia

1944 births
Living people
People from Riviera-Pays-d'Enhaut District
Swiss comics artists
Swiss comics writers